Michael Langer (born 6 January 1985) is an Austrian professional footballer who plays as a goalkeeper for Bundesliga club Schalke 04.

Club career
Formerly a goalkeeper for the German Bundesliga team VfB Stuttgart, he made his debut in the highest German division on 10 March 2007 in a game against Wolfsburg, as a replacement for regular goalkeeper Timo Hildebrand.

On 2 January 2008, he moved to SC Freiburg and the club terminated his contract on 8 May 2010. On 20 May 2010, Langer signed a two-year contract with 2. Bundesliga club FSV Frankfurt. In summer 2012, he moved to SV Sandhausen and signed again a two-year-contract. In April 2014, Langer canceled his contract with Sandhausen and joined Vålerenga IF.

Langer signed with the NASL's Tampa Bay Rowdies on 1 February 2016.

In 2017, Langer joined Schalke 04. 13 years after his first Bundesliga appearance for Stuttgart on 10 March 2007, he made his second-ever Bundesliga cap against Bayer Leverkusen on 6 December 2020.

International career
Langer played once for the Austrian Under-21 national team in 2006.

Career statistics

Honours
VfB Stuttgart
 Bundesliga: 2006–07

Schalke 04
2. Bundesliga: 2021–22

References

External links

 Profile at the FC Schalke 04 website
 

1985 births
Living people
People from Bregenz
Association football goalkeepers
Austrian footballers
Austria under-21 international footballers
VfB Stuttgart players
VfB Stuttgart II players
SC Freiburg players
FSV Frankfurt players
SV Sandhausen players
FC Schalke 04 players
Bundesliga players
2. Bundesliga players
Vålerenga Fotball players
Eliteserien players
Tampa Bay Rowdies players
North American Soccer League players
IFK Norrköping players
Allsvenskan players
Austrian expatriate footballers
Expatriate footballers in Germany
Austrian expatriate sportspeople in Germany
Expatriate footballers in Norway
Austrian expatriate sportspeople in Norway
Expatriate soccer players in the United States
Austrian expatriate sportspeople in the United States
Expatriate footballers in Sweden
Austrian expatriate sportspeople in Sweden
Footballers from Vorarlberg